The Twilight Zone is a nationally syndicated radio drama series featuring radio play adaptations of the classic television series The Twilight Zone first produced for the British station BBC Radio 4 Extra in October 2002 with the final show released in 2012 for 176 episodes in all.

Many of the stories are based on Rod Serling's scripts from the original Twilight Zone series, and are slightly expanded and updated to reflect contemporary technology and trends (e.g., the mention of "cell phones" and "CD-ROMs" which, of course, were not around when the television show aired in the 1960s) and the lack of a visual component.  In addition to adapting all of the original episodes aired on the 1959-1964 TV series, the radio series has also adapted some Twilight Zone TV scripts which were never produced, scripts from other Serling TV productions, and new stories written especially for the radio series. Taking Serling's role as narrator is Stacy Keach. 

Different Hollywood actors, such as Blair Underwood and James Caviezel, take the lead role in each radio drama. In addition, several stars who appeared on the original TV series, such as H.M. Wynant, Orson Bean and Morgan Brittany, appear, although purposely not in the roles they originated on television. The series features a full cast, music and sound effects and is produced in the flavor of classic radio dramas but using today's technology.  In addition to being an homage to the original Twilight Zone TV series (in many cases using the original music), the radio dramas pay tribute to the era of classic radio drama, including allusions to radio dramas such as Gunsmoke, the presence of radio legend Stan Freberg in many episodes, and the sons (Stacy Keach, Ed Begley Jr.) of radio drama personalities Stacy Keach Sr. (director, Tales of the Texas Rangers) and Ed Begley (actor, Richard Diamond, Private Detective) as stars in the series.

Licensed by CBS Enterprises and The Rod Serling Estate, The Twilight Zone radio series is produced by Carl Amari, CEO of Falcon Picture Group who hosts his own weekly nationally syndicated radio series, featuring classic radio, called "Hollywood 360." The scripts from the original Twilight Zone are adapted by Dennis Etchison and others, including one episode by Chas Holloway and several by British writer M. J. Elliott. New stories by Etchison and others that are not based on the original TV series are also featured. In Britain it has been heard on the digital channel BBC Radio 4 Extra. In the United States, it airs on nearly 200 radio stations including many large stations like WCCO-Minneapolis, KSL-Salt Lake City, KOA-Denver and WIND-Chicago. All of the stations and airtimes are available at the series official website. It also airs regularly on XM satellite radio channel 163 and Sirius channel 117, Sirius XM Book Radio. Most of the stations air two episodes each week, usually on the weekends and many times back to back.

The sound mix was produced at Falcon Picture Group studios and later at the Cerny Sound-to-Picture studio at Cerny American Creative in Chicago.  The sound engineers that work on the series include Roger Wolski, Bob Benson, Craig Lee, Tim Cerny and Jason Rizzo. The episodes are produced and directed by Carl Amari.

Episodes
The following episodes include stories that were adapted for radio from the original Twilight Zone television scripts, as well as original stories produced exclusively for this radio series.

Volume 1

Volume 2

Volume 3

Volume 4

Volume 5

Volume 6

Volume 7

Volume 8

Volume 9

Volume 10

Volume 11

Volume 12

Volume 13

Volume 14
This collection was only released as an online digital download, rather than on CD.

Volume 15
This collection was only released as an online digital download, rather than on CD.

Volume 16
This collection was only released as an online digital download, rather than on CD.

Volume 17
This collection was only released as an online digital download, rather than on CD.

Volume 18
This collection was only released as an online digital download, rather than on CD.

Releases

Website

The Twilight Zone Radio Dramas were initially produced in 2002 and made available for sale on-line with the launch of the Twilight Zone Radio website.  They were originally available in audio cassette tape and CD "collections" of 4 episodes apiece.  Eight episodes were produced in 2002, and eight more in 2003.  By late 2004, after the first 24 episodes were released between 6 numbered collections, the series would no longer be made available on cassette and new CD "volumes" comprising 10 episodes each were introduced with the release of six additional episodes, ending the year with 14 episodes for 30 in total, which were reorganized and shuffled between these first 3 volumes.

In 2006, volumes 4 through 9 were released (60 episodes), then volumes 10 through 12 appeared in 2007 (30 episodes), and volume 13 in 2008 (10 episodes) would be the last volume made available on CD.  Beginning in 2007, the shows were made available for individual MP3 download at $1.95 each, with most of volumes 14 through 17 released in 2009 and 2010 (38 episodes), and the last 8 episodes were produced between 2011 and 2012; leaving volume 18 incomplete with only 6 episodes.  The final episode is titled "Another Place in Time" with no plans for further production.

By mid 2015, the website moved off the www.twilightzoneradio.com website, and the domain redirected to hollywood360radio.net/TZ.

In 2016, the website went completely offline, and the latter web address now redirects to www.classicradiostore.com with no reference to Twilight Zone Radio anywhere on the website.

CDs and digital downloads of the shows can be purchased on Amazon and Audible from a variety of sources, with no real consistency in show or volume or collection composition, making it rather challenging to acquire all 176 episodes as of 2018.

Additionally, there were several of the download-able episodes that were different from the CD version. These two excerpts from "A Hundred Yards Over the Rim" The Twilight Zone (radio series)#Volume 3 (volume 3 episode 3) are an example.

DVD & Blu-ray

Some episodes of the radio drama were included on the DVD and Blu-ray releases of the TV series as special features alongside the original episodes. Although 155 out of 156 episodes of the TV series were remade as radio dramas (the exception being "Come Wander with Me"), only 30 are included on the DVD releases and 82 on the Blu-rays.

The radio episodes included on the Blu-rays are listed below in TV series order. Those that were previously included on DVD releases are noted.

Season 1
 "Where Is Everybody?"
 "One for the Angels" (also on DVD)
 "Walking Distance"
 "Escape Clause"
 "The Lonely" (also on DVD)
 "Time Enough at Last"
 "Perchance to Dream"
 "I Shot an Arrow into the Air" (also on DVD)
 "The Hitch-Hiker"
 "The Fever"
 "The Last Flight"
 "Mirror Image"
 "The Monsters Are Due on Maple Street" (also on DVD)
 "Long Live Walter Jameson"
 "People Are Alike All Over"
 "The Big Tall Wish" (also on DVD)
 "The After Hours" (also on DVD)
 "The Mighty Casey"

Season 2
 "The Man in the Bottle"
 "Nervous Man in a Four Dollar Room" (also on DVD)
 "The Howling Man"
 "Nick of Time"
 "The Lateness of the Hour" (also on DVD)
 "The Trouble with Templeton"
 "The Night of the Meek"
 "Back There"
 "The Whole Truth"
 "The Odyssey of Flight 33" (also on DVD)
 "Static"
 "A Hundred Yards Over the Rim" (also on DVD)
 "The Silence"
 "Will the Real Martian Please Stand Up?" (also on DVD)
 "The Obsolete Man" (also on DVD)

Season 3
 "Two"
 "The Arrival"
 "The Shelter"
 "The Passersby" (also on DVD)
 "The Mirror"
 "The Grave"
 "Deaths-Head Revisited" (also on DVD)
 "Still Valley" (also on DVD)
 "The Jungle"
 "Five Characters in Search of an Exit"
 "One More Pallbearer" (also on DVD)
 "Dead Man's Shoes"
 "Kick the Can"
 "A Piano in the House"
 "To Serve Man"
 "Four O'Clock" (also on DVD)
 "The Trade-Ins"
 "The Dummy" (also on DVD)
 "The Changing of the Guard"

Season 4
 "The Thirty-Fathom Grave" (also on DVD)
 "No Time Like the Past" (also on DVD)
 "The Parallel" (also on DVD)
 "Of Late I Think of Cliffordville" (also on DVD)
 "The Incredible World of Horace Ford" (also on DVD)
 "On Thursday We Leave for Home"
 "The Bard" (also on DVD)

Season 5
 "Steel"
 "Nightmare at 20,000 Feet"
 "A Kind of a Stopwatch" (also on DVD)
 "Living Doll" (also on DVD)
 "The Old Man in the Cave"
 "Uncle Simon"
 "Probe 7, Over and Out"
 "The 7th Is Made Up of Phantoms" (also on DVD)
 "A Short Drink from a Certain Fountain"
 "Ninety Years Without Slumbering"
 "The Long Morrow" (also on DVD)
 "The Self-Improvement of Salvadore Ross"
 "Night Call"
 "From Agnes—With Love"
 "Queen of the Nile"
 "What's in the Box"
 "The Masks"
 "Sounds and Silences" (also on DVD)
 "Caesar and Me"
 "Mr. Garrity and the Graves" (also on DVD)
 "The Brain Center at Whipple's"
 "The Fear"
 "The Bewitchin' Pool"

References

Radio
American radio dramas
Twilight Zone